Hackelia californica is a species of flowering plant in the borage family known by the common name California stickseed.

Distribution
The plant is native to the mountain ranges of northern California and southern Oregon, including the southern Cascade Range, Northern California Coast Ranges, and Sierra Nevada.

Description
Hackelia californica is a leafy perennial herb grows in tall clumps and produces erect stems up to a meter in maximum height. The lance-shaped leaves are longest and most abundant near the base of the plant, where the longest are about 17 centimeters long.

The tips of the stems have few leaves and are occupied by cyme inflorescences of white flowers. Each flower has five lobes with a small petallike appendage at its base. The bloom period is June to August.

The fruit is a prickly nutlet about 4 millimeters wide.

External links
Hackelia californica (California stickseed)
Jepson Manual eFlora (TJM2) treatment of Hackelia californica

californica
Flora of California
Flora of Oregon
Flora of the Cascade Range
Flora of the Sierra Nevada (United States)
Natural history of the California Coast Ranges
Flora without expected TNC conservation status